M/Y Yogi was a motor yacht, finished in 2011 by the Turkish builder Proteksan Turquoise, at a length of  and price tag of US$39m.

References

Individual yachts